Svend Gunnarsen Auken (24 May 1943 – 4 August 2009) was a Danish politician. He represented the Social Democrats as a member of the Danish parliament (Folketinget) from 1971 until his death.

He was married to journalist and editor Bettina Heltberg from 1966 to 1993. At his death he was married to film director Anne Wivel. He had four children. Margrete Auken is his sister.

He died of prostate cancer on 4 August 2009.

Political career
Auken held a degree in political science from the University of Aarhus and also taught there for a period in the very early 1970s. He was Minister of Employment from 1 October 1977 to 10 September 1982 in the Cabinet of Anker Jørgensen II, III, IV, and V.

In 1987 Svend Auken succeeded Jørgensen as leader of the Danish Social Democrats, at that time an opposition party to the government of Prime Minister Poul Schlüter. After making big gains in the 1990 general election, he was subsequently unable to put together a workable coalition, partly because of bad personal relations with prominent politicians in the traditional coalition party of the Social Democrats, Det Radikale Venstre (The Social Liberal Party of Denmark).

His position as leader of the Social Democrats was challenged in 1992 by Poul Nyrup Rasmussen, who went on to win the internal election. That gave Auken the dubious distinction of being the first Social Democratic leader since 1910 to not become prime minister. (Subsequently, this has happened to Mogens Lykketoft, leader from 2002 to 2005, as well.)

Poul Nyrup Rasmussen went on to become Prime Minister of Denmark in 1993, and Auken served as Minister for the Environment from 25 January 1993 to 27 September 1994 in the Cabinet of Poul Nyrup Rasmussen I and was Minister for the Environment and Energy from 27 September 1994 to 27 November 2001 in the Cabinet of Poul Nyrup Rasmussen II, III and IV.

After the defeat of Rasmussen's government in the general election of 2001, Svend Auken continued to serve as a member of the Danish parliament. He was the EU-affairs spokesman of his party until his death, and he maintained a high profile on environmental issues.

Svend Auken was generally acknowledged to be one of the most naturally gifted and charismatic Danish politicians of his generation, and he is sometimes referred to as "the best Prime Minister Denmark never had".
He is one of the few Danish politicians to be honoured in the United States House of Representatives.

References
 CV - from Folketinget.

1943 births
2009 deaths
Politicians from Aarhus
Deaths from cancer in Denmark
Deaths from prostate cancer
Government ministers of Denmark
Members of the Folketing 1971–1973
Members of the Folketing 1973–1975
Members of the Folketing 1975–1977
Members of the Folketing 1977–1979
Members of the Folketing 1979–1981
Members of the Folketing 1981–1984
Members of the Folketing 1984–1987
Members of the Folketing 1987–1988
Members of the Folketing 1988–1990
Members of the Folketing 1990–1994
Members of the Folketing 1994–1998
Members of the Folketing 1998–2001
Members of the Folketing 2001–2005
Members of the Folketing 2005–2007
Members of the Folketing 2007–2011
Aarhus University alumni
Social Democrats (Denmark) politicians
Danish Ministers for the Environment
Burials at Holmen Cemetery
Leaders of the Social Democrats (Denmark)